The UK R&B Chart is a weekly chart that ranks the 40 biggest-selling singles and albums that are classified in the R&B genre in the United Kingdom. The chart is compiled by the Official Charts Company, and is based on both physical and digital sales. 
The following are the number-one singles of 2012.

Number-one singles

Notes
  - The album was simultaneously number-one on the UK singles chart. 
  - The artist was simultaneously number-one on the R&B albums chart.

See also

List of UK Singles Chart number ones of 2012
List of UK R&B Albums Chart number ones of 2012

References

External links
R&B Singles Top 40 at the Official Charts Company
UK Top 40 RnB Singles at BBC Radio 1

2012 in British music
United Kingdom RandB Singles
2012